Zhang Jinghui (Chang Ching-hui; ; Hepburn: Chō Keikei); (1871 – 1 November 1959) was a Chinese general, warlord and politician during the Warlord era. He is noted for his role in the Japanese puppet regime of Manchukuo in which he served as its second and final Prime Minister.

Biography
Zhang Jinghui was born in Tai'an, southwest of Mukden, Liaoning Province. The area was a battlefield in the First Sino-Japanese War and he joined the Honghuzi irregular cavalry forces of the Manchurian warlord Zhang Zuolin at an early age. These forces were recruited as mercenaries by the Japanese during the Russo-Japanese War of 1904-05.

In the final years of the Qing dynasty, Zhang Zuolin was appointed Viceroy of Three Northeast Provinces with his base at Fengtian, and with the Xinhai Revolution managed to obtain recognition of his forces as part of the new Republic of China military. At that time he was appointed commander of the Beiyang Army’s 27th Infantry Brigade. However, with the death of Yuan Shikai in 1916, the Beiyang Army split into several mutually hostile factions.

Zhang Jinghui deserted Zhang Zuolin to join Wu Peifu's Zhili clique. He later rejoined Zhang Zuolin and served as his Minister of War in the Beiyang Government from May 1926 to June 1927 and as Minister of Enterprises in the National Pacification Army Government from June 1927 to June 1928. Within a year he was appointed governor of the Harbin and China Eastern Railway Special District in northern Manchuria. However, following the death of Zhang Zuolin in the Huanggutun Incident on 4 June 1928, Zhang Jinghui’s relations with his son and successor, Zhang Xueliang, deteriorated. Nevertheless, both men participated in a national unity conference called by Kuomintang leader Chiang Kai-shek in January 1929 in Nanjing.

However, the political balance was changed after the Mukden Incident and the successful invasion of Manchuria by the Japanese Kwantung Army in 1931. Zhang called a conference in his office on 27 September 1931 to organize an "Emergency Committee of the Special District", with the goal of achieving the secession of Manchuria from China. Following the expulsion of pro-Kuomintang Gen. Ma Zhanshan from Qiqihar, Zhang proclaimed his territory to be self-governing and was inaugurated as governor on 7 January 1932. Uncertain of the intentions of the Soviet Union to the north, and unable to withstand the Japanese military presence to the south, Zhang reached an agreement with the Japanese and accepted an appointment as governor of Heilongjiang Province in the new Japanese-run state of Manchukuo. His refusal, though, to leave his stronghold in Harbin to take up residence in Qiqihar created friction with the Kwangtung Army leadership. However, when Ma Zhanshan agreed to terms with the Japanese on 14 February 1932 in exchange for the post of Governor of Heilongjiang Province, Zhang was set aside. Ma revolted in April 1932 and Zhang took his place as Minister of Defense of the Empire of Manchukuo.

On 21 May 1935, Zhang succeeded Zheng Xiaoxu as Prime Minister of Manchukuo at the instigation of the Kwantung Army over the objections of Emperor Puyi. As Prime Minister of Manchukuo, Zhang preferred to take a passive figurehead role, allowing the Japanese advisors seconded from the Kwantung Army to handle all aspects of day-to-day administration while he spent his days copying Buddhist sutras. Reviled by modern Chinese historians for his pro-Japanese stance, and nicknamed “the Tofu Prime Minister” even in his lifetime, Zhang was recorded to have only once spoken out against the Japanese administration—to criticize the forced sale of lands to Japanese colonists.
In 1943 he was the official delegate from Manchukuo to the Greater East Asia Conference held in Tokyo. That same year a false report was published in  Time Magazine that Zhang had poisoned his family and killed his Japanese advisor and other members of the Manchukuo government before committing suicide.

Zhang held the position of Prime Minister until the collapse of Manchukuo following the Soviet Red Army's invasion of Manchuria in August 1945.

Following World War II he was held in custody by the Soviet Union in Siberia and extradited to the People's Republic of China in 1950, where he was imprisoned at the Fushun War Criminals Management Centre. He died of heart failure nine years later in 1959.

References

External links 
IMTFE Judgement, Invasion & Occupation of Manchuria
 Photo at World War II Database

Chinese collaborators with Imperial Japan
Prime Ministers of Manchukuo
Government ministers of Manchukuo
Republic of China warlords from Liaoning
Politicians from Anshan
World War II political leaders
1871 births
1959 deaths
Chinese people imprisoned abroad
Chinese people who died in prison custody
Prisoners who died in Chinese detention
Prisoners and detainees of the People's Republic of China
People extradited from the Soviet Union
People extradited to China
Chinese anti-communists
Heads of government convicted of war crimes